Halieutopsis tumifrons, also known as the truncate-snout deepsea batfish, is a species of fish in the family Ogcocephalidae.

It is found in the Eastern Pacific Ocean near the Cocos Islands and in the Galapagos Islands.

References

Ogcocephalidae
Marine fish genera
Fish described in 1899
Taxa named by Samuel Garman